Monochrome refers to an image or palette comprising shades of a single color. Monochromatic may be used synonymously with monochrome, or may refer to a distinct concept: to describe light that is composed of a single wavelength (Monochromatic radiation), which evokes a spectral color.

Monochrome may also refer to:

Technology 
 Monochrome monitor, used with computers
 Monochrome photography, also known as black-and-white photography
 Monochrome painting, a style of painting that uses a single color (excluding shades thereof)
 Monochrome printmaking, printing styles that generate black-and-white images
 Monochrome BBS, a text-based multi-user bulletin board system

Music

Albums 
 Monochrome (Helmet album), 2006, or the title track
 Monochrome (July for Kings album), 2009
 Monochrome (Lee Hyori album), 2013
 Monochrome, a 2002 live album and DVD by German rock band Fury in the Slaughterhouse
Monochrome, a 2017 solo album by Daniel Cavanagh from the band Anathema

Songs 
 "Monochrome" (Ammonia song), 1998
 "Monochrome", a song by The Sundays from their 1997 album Static & Silence
 "Monochrome", a song by Yann Tiersen with vocals by Dominique A, from Tiersen's 1998 album Le Phare
 "Monochrome", a track from the 1999 release A by Japanese singer-songwriter Ayumi Hamasaki

See also
 Monochromacy (or monochromatism), a type of color vision deficiency
 monochrom, an international art-technology-philosophy group
 Chromate (disambiguation)